Graig is a historic district of the town of Pontypridd, Rhondda Cynon Taf, South Wales. It is also the name of an electoral ward for the town and county councils.

Graig was historically referred to as 'Rhiw' (hill).  The area is closely associated with coal mining and consists largely of terraced housing.  Notable collieries within the area include - Gelli-whion (Gelliwion) Colliery, Newbridge Colliery (1844), Pen-y-rhiw (Penrhiw) Colliery (c1870) and Pontypridd Maritime Collieries (1841).  Graig today is also home to the Dewi Sant Hospital.

Electoral ward
Graig is a ward for Pontypridd Town Council, electing two town councillors.

Between 1976 and 1996 Graig was an electoral ward to Taff-Ely Borough Council, electing two district councillors.

Graig subsequently became a ward to Rhondda Cynon Taf County Borough Council, electing one county councillor. Following a ward boundary review, it was merged with neighbouring Rhondda to form a new larger ward of 'Graig and Pontypridd West', electing two county borough councillors. The change was effective from the 2022 Rhondda Cynon Taf County Borough Council election.

References

External links
http://www.geograph.org.uk/gridref/ST0789?inner
https://web.archive.org/web/20111003130514/http://archive.rhondda-cynon-taf.gov.uk/treorchy/index.php?a=wordsearch&s=gallery&w=graig+pontypridd

Pontypridd
Villages in Rhondda Cynon Taf
Wards of Rhondda Cynon Taf